Replication protein A (RPA) is the major protein that binds to single-stranded DNA (ssDNA) in eukaryotic cells. In vitro, RPA shows a much higher affinity for ssDNA than RNA or double-stranded DNA. RPA is required in replication, recombination and repair processes such as nucleotide excision repair and homologous recombination.  It also plays roles in responding to damaged DNA.

Structure 
RPA is a heterotrimer, composed of the subunits RPA1 (RPA70) (70kDa subunit), RPA2 (RPA32) (32kDa subunit) and RPA3 (RPA14) (14kDa subunit). The three RPA subunits contain six OB-folds (oligonucleotide/oligosaccharide binding),with DNA-binding domains (DBD) designated DBDs A-F, that bind RPA to single-stranded DNA.

DBDs A, B, C and F are located on RPA1, DBD D is located on RPA2, and DBD E is located on RPA3.  DBDs C, D, and E make up the trimerization core of the protein with flexible linker regions connecting them all together.  Due to these flexible linker regions RPA is considered highly flexible and this supports the dynamic binding that RPA is able to achieve.  Because of this dynamic binding, RPA is also capable of different conformations that leads to varied numbers of nucleotides that it can engage.

DBDs A, B, C and D are the sites that are involved in ssDNA binding.  Protein-protein interactions between RPA and other proteins happen at the N-terminal of RPA1, specifically DBD F, along with the C-terminal of RPA2.  Phosphorylation of RPA takes place at the N-terminus of RPA2.

RPA shares many features with the CST complex heterotrimer, although RPA has a more uniform 1:1:1 stoichiometry.

Functions 
During DNA replication, RPA prevents single-stranded DNA (ssDNA) from winding back on itself or from forming secondary structures. It also helps protect the ssDNA from being attacked by endonucleases. This keeps DNA unwound for the polymerase to replicate it.  RPA also binds to ssDNA during the initial phase of homologous recombination, an important process in DNA repair and prophase I of meiosis.

Hypersensitivity to DNA damaging agents can be caused by mutations in the RPA gene.  Like its role in DNA replication, this keeps ssDNA from binding to itself (self-complementizing) so that the resulting nucleoprotein filament can then be bound by Rad51 and its cofactors.

RPA also binds to DNA during the nucleotide excision repair process. This binding stabilizes the repair complex during the repair process. A bacterial homolog is called single-strand binding protein (SSB).

See also 
 Single-stranded binding protein
 Replication protein A1
 Replication protein A2
 Replication protein A3

References 

Genetics